Salmon is a masculine given name which may refer to:

 Salmon (biblical figure), a descendant of Abraham and ancestor of David
 Salmon Brown, two people related to American abolitionist John Brown:
 Salmon Brown (1802–1833), his younger brother
 Salmon Brown (1836–1919), his youngest son
 Salmon P. Chase (1808–1873), American politician and jurist
 Salmon Levinson (1865–1941), American lawyer and peace activist responsible for drafting the Kellogg–Briand Pact
 Salmon Morrice (1672–1740), Royal Navy officer and Vice-admiral of the White

See also
Salmon (surname)
Salman (name), given name and surname

English-language masculine given names